The sombre pigeon (Cryptophaps poecilorrhoa) is a species of bird in the family Columbidae. It is the only species within the genus Cryptophaps. It is endemic to the Indonesian island of Sulawesi in Wallacea. Its natural habitat is subtropical or tropical moist montane forests.

References

sombre pigeon
Endemic birds of Sulawesi
sombre pigeon
Taxonomy articles created by Polbot